Brittany Riley (born August 26, 1986, in Flossmoor, Illinois) is a female hammer thrower from the United States. Her personal best throw is 72.51 metres, achieved in April 2007 in Des Moines.

International competitions

References

 
 Brittany Riley at USA Track & Field

1986 births
Living people
Sportspeople from Cook County, Illinois
American female hammer throwers
African-American female track and field athletes
Pan American Games track and field athletes for the United States
Athletes (track and field) at the 2007 Pan American Games
World Athletics Championships athletes for the United States
People from Flossmoor, Illinois
Female weight throwers
Track and field athletes from Illinois
21st-century African-American sportspeople
21st-century African-American women
20th-century African-American people
20th-century African-American women